Elaphrus uliginosus is a species of ground beetle native to the Palearctic realm. It is widespread but rare in Europe, and is absent from much of Southern Europe. It is a wetland and coastal species.

References

External links
Images representing Elaphrus uliginosus  at Barcode of Life Data System

Elaphrinae
Beetles of Asia
Beetles of Europe
Beetles described in 1792
Taxa named by Johan Christian Fabricius